David Fry (born 1960) is an English football goalkeeper.

David Fry may also refer to:

 David Fry (politician) (born 1957),  Australian politician
 David Fry (publisher), owner of I-5 Publishing
 David Lee Fry, American militant, see Citizens for Constitutional Freedom

See also
 David Fried (born 1962), American iartist
 David L. Fried (born 1933), American scientist in optics
 David Fries (born 1960), American scientist and author in advanced robotics and ocean sensors
 David Frye (1933–2011), American comedian
 David Frye (American football) (born 1961), American football player